Events of 2019 in Rwanda

Incumbents
 President: Paul Kagame
 Prime Minister: Édouard Ngirente

Events

Births

Deaths

 
Rwanda